Zalesie Wielkie  is a village in the administrative district of Gmina Kobylin, within Krotoszyn County, Greater Poland Voivodeship, in west-central Poland.

Notable people
 Cyryl Ratajski, Polish politician

References

Villages in Krotoszyn County